BSC may refer to:
 Bachelor of Science, an educational degree, holders sometimes using post-nominal BSc

Organizations

Education
 Bentleigh Secondary College, in Melbourne, Australia
 Brentwood Secondary College, in Melbourne, Australia
 Birmingham–Southern College, in Alabama, United States
 Bismarck State College, in North Dakota, United States
 Bridgewater State University, in Massachusetts, United States
 Buffalo State College, in New York, United States
 Bluefield State College, in West Virginia, United States
 Bryant & Stratton College, a for-profit college chain in the United States
 Berkeley Student Cooperative, a housing organization at University of California, Berkeley

Companies
 Boston Scientific Corporation, a medical device company
 British Steel Corporation, a metal manufacturer
 Bear Stearns, an investment bank, by stock symbol
 British Sugar Corporation, a company that became part of British Sugar
 Boston Sports Clubs, a fitness club chain owned by Town Sports International Holdings

Other
 Barcelona Supercomputing Center, a research facility
 Bird Studies Canada, a nature conservation organization
 British Security Co-ordination, a British World War II intelligence and propaganda operation in the United States
 British Society of Cinematographers, a movie craft organization, members sometimes using post-nominal BSC
 Broadcasting Standards Commission, a British government agency incorporated into Ofcom
 California Building Standards Commission, a US state agency responsible for building codes

Science and technology
 Binary symmetric channel, a data transmission error model
 Binary Synchronous Communications, a computer networking protocol
 Biological safety cabinet, a laboratory pathogen housing 
 Biological Stain Commission, an independent quality-control service for dyes 
 Bright Star Catalogue, a list of stars visible to the naked-eye
 Bristol stool chart, a medical assessment scale for feces
 British Standard Cycle, a screw thread standard
 Biological species concept, a rule for distinguishing species
 Base station controller, part of a mobile telephone network
 Basic Spacing between Centers, in IC package

Sport
 Barcelona Sporting Club, an Ecuadorian football club
 Basra Sports City, a sports complex in Iraq
 Bay State Conference, a high school athletic conference in Massachusetts, United States
 Big Sky Conference, a western United States college conference
 Big South Conference, a southeastern United States college conference
 Bi-State Conference, an Arkansas and Oklahoma junior college conference
 Bohemian Sporting Club, a Filipino football club
 Hertha BSC, a German football club
 BSC Glasgow F.C., a Scottish football club

Music
 Black Stone Cherry, an American hard rock band
 Blood Stain Child, a Japanese melodic death metal band
 Bundesvision Song Contest, a German music contest
 The Beacon Street Collection, a ska punk album by No Doubt

Other uses
 Balanced scorecard, an organizational performance analysis tool
 Best supportive care, a term for palliative care used in clinical trials
 Broglio Space Centre, a spaceport
 The Baby-sitters Club, a series of books
 Building Service Cleaners
Binance Smart Chain, a cryptocurrency by Binance

See also
 BCS (disambiguation)